Lower Sydenham railway station is located on the boundary of the London Borough of Bromley and the London Borough of Lewisham in south-east London.

The station serves the localities of Lower Sydenham and Southend. Served and managed by Southeastern, it is on the Hayes Line as part of its Metro routes.

History

Early years (1857-1922)
The Mid Kent line was built by the Mid-Kent and North Kent Junction Railway (MK&NKJR) and was opened on 1 January 1857 as far as Beckenham Junction (although it was not technically a junction as the West End of London and Crystal Palace Railway's line did not open until 3 May 1858).

From opening the line was worked by the South Eastern Railway (SER). On opening Lower Sydenham was provided with a small goods yard.

Seven years later the MK&NKJR built an extension from a new junction station at New Beckenham to Croydon (Addiscombe Road) which again was operated by the SER.
In 1878 a connection was added a quarter-mile north of the station to serve the Crystal Palace District Gas Company (which had been established on the site in 1854).

Almost all services from the station have terminated at Charing Cross or Cannon Street stations but between 1880 and 1884 a service worked between Croydon (Addiscombe Road) calling all stations to New Cross and then via a connection to the East London Line and terminating at Liverpool Street station.
In the 1890s housing developed to the north and west of the station.

In 1898 the South Eastern Railway and its bitter rivals the London Chatham and Dover Railway agreed to work as one railway company under the name of the South Eastern and Chatham Railway and Lower Sydenham became an SECR station.

In 1906 the station was moved 100 yards south in an effort to develop a new area for housing.

By 1912 the gasworks were now owned by the South Suburban Gas Company and had three steam locomotives operating on three miles of track.

Southern Railway (1923-1947)
Following the Railways Act 1921 (also known as the Grouping Act), Lower Sydenham became a Southern Railway station on 1 January 1923.

The Mid-Kent line was electrified with the (750 V DC third rail) system and electric services commenced on 28 February 1926.  Early electric services were worked by early Southern Railway 3-car Electric Multiple Unit trains often built from old SECR carriages. Electrification saw more houses built in the Lower Sydenham area which also picked up some passengers from the large London County Council estate at Bellingham.

British Railways (1948-1994)
After World War II and following nationalisation on 1 January 1948, the station fell under the auspices of British Railways Southern Region.

In the 1950s the line was still busy with freight traffic with four early morning seaborne coal trains routed from Erith to Brockley Lane (reverse) and then to the gas works. In addition there were trains from Bricklayers Arms that served the various goods yards (including Lower Sydenham) along the line.

The goods yard closed to general traffic on 28 December 1964 and to coal on 25 March 1968. The change from coal generated gas to North Sea gas saw rail traffic to the gas works cease on 22 April 1969 with the connection being removed as part of the 1971 re-signalling.

Colour light signalling was introduced between Ladywell and New Beckenham on 4 April 1971 with signalling being controlled by the signal box at New Beckenham. The original SER signal box closed as a result.

In 1972 the timber structure was replaced by a modern "CLASP" type structure.

On 28 September 1975 the control of the signalling was transferred to London Bridge signalling centre.

Upon sectorisation in 1982, three passenger sectors were created: InterCity, operating principal express services; and London & South East (renamed Network SouthEast in 1986) who operated commuter services in the London area.

The station building was burned down in 1989 and a newer structure was provided by Network South East in 1991.

The privatisation era (1994-Present Day)
Following privatisation of British Rail on 1 April 1994 the infrastructure at Lower Sydenham station became the responsibility of Railtrack whilst a business unit operated the train services. On 13 October 1996 operation of the passenger services passed to Connex South Eastern who were originally due to run the franchise until 2011.

Following a number of accidents and financial issues Railtrack plc was sold to Network Rail on 3 October 2002 who became responsible for the infrastructure.

On 27 June 2003 the Strategic Rail Authority decided to strip Connex of the franchise citing poor financial management and run the franchise itself. Connex South Eastern continued to operate the franchise until 8 November 2003 with the services transferring to the Strategic Rail Authority's South Eastern Trains subsidiary the following day.

On 30 November 2005 the Department for Transport awarded Govia the Integrated Kent franchise. The services operated by South Eastern Trains transferred to Southeastern on 1 April 2006.

Services 

The typical off-peak service in trains per hour is:
 4 tph to 

On Sundays, the station is served by a half-hourly service between Hayes and London Charing Cross via Lewisham.

Layout
The station has step free access to both platforms with entrances on both sides however, the footbridges have no lifts. Lower Sydenham has two footbridges while platform 1 has a ticket office and a ticket machine. Both platform have brick built shelters and the platforms can fit 10 carriage trains. The station main building was rebuilt in the 1990s following an arson attack.

Connections
London Buses route 352 serves the station.

References

External links 

Railway stations in the London Borough of Lewisham
Former South Eastern Railway (UK) stations
Railway stations in Great Britain opened in 1906
Railway stations served by Southeastern